AEC Regent may refer to any of the following double-decker buses :

AEC Regent or AEC Regent I, 1929 model
AEC Regent II
AEC Regent III
AEC Regent III RT
AEC Regent V